Paula Bradley (born 23 June 1969) is a Unionist politician from Northern Ireland, who has served as  Deputy Leader of the Democratic Unionist Party  (DUP) since May 2021. She was a Member of the Northern Ireland Assembly (MLA) for Belfast North from 2011 to 2022. She also served as Deputy Mayor of Newtownabbey Borough Council in 2009–10. She was elected Deputy Leader of the Democratic Unionist Party on 14 May 2021, and became the first woman to hold the office on 28 May 2021.

Bradley was first elected to Newtownabbey Council in the 2005 local election, representing the Antrim Line electoral area. She served as deputy mayor in 2009–2010 and was elected mayor in June 2010. Outside politics, she has worked as a social worker at Antrim Area Hospital.

In July 2021 Bradley said that some of the things said about the LGBT community by her party colleagues had been “absolutely atrocious” and that she was sorry: “I can certainly say I apologise for what others have said and done in the past, because I do think there have been some very hurtful comments and some language that really should not have been used.”

Bradley announced on 17 March 2022 that she would not seek re-election at the 2022 Assembly election, reversing a decision she had previously made. She told BBC News NI that she wanted to look after her mother, Charlotte, who has a number of health issues. "My mum needs me more and I have decided to prioritise her over my political career," she said. "She sacrificed so much for me and I feel I need to be there for her."

References

External links
Profile on BBC Democracy Live (archived)

1969 births
Living people
Mayors of Newtownabbey
Members of Newtownabbey Borough Council
Democratic Unionist Party MLAs
Northern Ireland MLAs 2011–2016
Northern Ireland MLAs 2016–2017
Northern Ireland MLAs 2017–2022
Female members of the Northern Ireland Assembly
Women mayors of places in Northern Ireland
Women councillors in Northern Ireland